The Painted Veil is the original soundtrack, on the Deutsche Grammophon label, of the 2006 Golden Globe-winning film The Painted Veil starring Naomi Watts and Edward Norton. The original score and songs were composed by Alexandre Desplat.

The album won the Golden Globe Award for Best Original Score.

Track listing
 The Painted Veil 3:19
 Gnossienne no.1 (Erik Satie) 3:24
 Colony Club 2:09
 River Waltz 2:24
 Kitty's Theme 3:08
 Death Convoy 2:50
 The Water Wheel 6:21
 The Lovers 1:27
 Promenade 2:06
 Kitty's Journey 2:51
 The Deal 3:23
 Walter's Mission 3:57
 The Convent 0:52
 River Waltz (piano solo) 2:27
 Morning Tears 1:52
 Cholera 4:23
 The End of Love 4:36
 The Funeral 0:53
 From Shanghai to London 2:03

2007 soundtrack albums
Drama film soundtracks